Tray is a given name. Notable people with the name include:

Tray Blackmon (born 1985), American football player
Tray Chaney, American actor
Tray Grinter (1885–1996, English cricketer
Tray Walker (1992–2016), American football player

See also
Trae, given name
Trey (given name)